PinpointBPS is a methodology for process improvement in laboratories. It is underpinned by eight principles that form the basis for decision-making in a laboratory. While its application is mainly in healthcare — particularly medical laboratories — it has also been applied in other industries. The methodology has been heralded as "groundbreaking" in the field of laboratory performance improvement.

Overview 
Medical laboratories operate in highly regulated environments that demand consistent quality of patient outputs. The external environment’s impact on the broader global healthcare industry is also dictating the need for ongoing improvements in quality and delivery while using fewer resources that leads to cost savings. Among other regulations, the Carter Report in the United Kingdom dictates that GBP£200-million in cost savings must be achieved by 2020, while the Affordable Care Act in the United States, also known as Obamacare, imposed further taxation requirements on medical laboratories, reducing cost saving ability. Dr. Jonathan Berg stated at The Royal College of Pathologists' annual meeting in 2012 that "We need to be creative and innovative in the services we offer, and we need to get our finances under control", indicating the critical need for innovation within pathology and a stronger focus on financial controls and performance. Within this context, PinpointBPS was founded as a methodology focusing on innovation, risk reduction and financial impact relating to laboratory performance improvement.

Methodology 
The PinpointBPS methodology is centered on the following process of discovery that highlights current performance, expected future performance and the means to achieve it. The methodology has also been aligned with ISO 15189 requirements.

The PinpointBPS Methodology 
The steps below provide a high-level overview of the methodology in practice.

1. Focus on quantified value 
While all effort within the laboratory is put into value creation, from turnaround time improvements to quality output and cost savings / profit increases, it is important that the performance of each of these can be quantified and their relationship with the financial performance of the laboratory understood. This enables the laboratory to understand current performance needs while at the same time establishing the key performance indicators that are important and should be measured.

2. Determine current performance 
Understanding the current performance of the laboratory provides the necessary context to highlight performance improvement requirements as well as areas of excellence. This should be conducted by looking at sample turnaround time and resource utilization, and should be considered on a holistic basis, creating a virtual model of the whole laboratory by mapping out all processes and activities in detail. This provides an end-to-end perspective on current performance and forms the basis for future performance improvement initiatives.

3. Understand future performance 
The expectation for future performance should be done through business process modeling, with current performance as the foundation. Using LIS data as well as data from workforce scheduling, and combining this data with the process model of the laboratory, creates an environment where changes to the laboratory can be simulated and the impact to performance understood in quantifiable terms. It is important to validate both the integrity of the data and the accuracy of the model. Once a desirable outcome for future performance has been found, the difference (or delta) in performance is evaluated to understand future performance requirements.

4. Establish performance delta and requirements 
The difference in performance between current (baseline) and future (expected) performance highlights the necessary process changes and related initiatives that are required to achieve the future performance. This impact should be measured according to finance (cost or profit), quality and turnaround time. For these changes to take effect, each change initiative is prioritized based on a quantified understanding of its impact to the laboratory 'bottom line', while also improving turnaround time, quality or both.

Comparison with Lean 
While the PinpointBPS methodology can support Lean (and other continuous improvement methodologies like Six Sigma) in that it ultimately aims to provide patients and other stakeholders with quality outputs, its approach differs from other methodologies like the Lean Laboratory in various ways:
 While lean focuses on waste and the elimination thereof, PinpointBPS focuses on understanding process and the impact of changes to processes on value while reducing risk.
 The definition of success differs in its layers of ambiguity. The focus of lean is to achieve "the happy situation of perfect value provided with zero waste", while PinpointBPS aims to establish a quantified definition of future value — "facts and figures, no fluff".
 Lean has evolved from the manufacturing approach first designed by Toyota in the 1950s, while PinpointBPS has been specifically developed for use in pathology performance improvement.
 Lean allows for the focus and treatment of individual or isolated performance issues, while PinpointBPS motivates for a system-wide approach first by creating visibility and testing.
 Prioritization in Lean is done according customer priority or on a FIFO (first in, first out) basis, while PinpointBPS encourages prioritization according to expected, quantified output linked to cost reduction or profit generation.

PinpointBPS in Practice 
PinpointPBS has been based on eight practical principles that allow laboratories to take ownership of the methodology and performance improvement initiatives.

The 8 Principles

1. Boost the bottom-line, or bust 
As with any organization, value creation is the ultimate goal, however purely focusing on quality output may neglect cognizance of financial value. Understanding the ultimate financial impact of any value creating activity is critical for ongoing sustainability.

2. Led by a common language 
Ensuring that everyone in the organization (and value chain) has the same understanding of value creation and how it links to financial performance

Continuous innovation requires us to draw from the same knowledge and speak the same language. We establish a universal truth that enables us to work together seamlessly.

3. Trust the transparency 
We value a clear line of sight into our strengths, our weaknesses and the connections between every process, person, and piece of technology.

4. Facts and figures, no fluff 
We believe in making decisions based on evidence. In our quest for bottom-line impact, every business action must be supported by real, tangible proof.

5. Driven by decisiveness 
We are empowered through understanding our performance and what shapes it. This allows everyone in our organization to make decisions swiftly, with understanding and certainty.

6. Inaccuracy is inexcusable 
Close is not close enough. Every decision we take is based on fact, and our execution must be accomplished with the same precision

7. Big impact beats small 
We believe in following the big opportunities that significantly impact the bottom line, rather than wasting time and resources on those that do not.

8. Knowledge knows no bounds 
We are only as good as the collective we represent. We fundamentally believe in continually imparting knowledge and learning from each other to move the industry forward.

Tools 
Various tools have been developed to enable the methodology in laboratories, including performance overviews, standardized process mapping using BPMN (business process model and notation), as well as simulation and scenario modeling.

Professional certification 
PinpointBPS professional certification can be granted to both laboratories that practice the methodology, as well as people who have successfully completed further study of the methodology. Two levels of PinpointBPS professional certifications exist. These certifications have been accredited by PACE, CPD, and the Royal College of Pathologists.

Champion 
A PinpointBPS Champion is a professional who is able to interpret laboratory performance improvement metrics, map out all processes within a laboratory and make improvement recommendations.

Master 
A PinpointBPS Master builds on the PinpointBPS Champion certification and is a professional who is able to simulate changes to a laboratory and interpret performance outputs, to make performance improvement recommendations and manage initiatives from start to end.

References 

Laboratories
Business process